The president of the Senate is the presiding officer of the upper house of the Federal Parliament of Belgium. The current president of the Senate is Stephanie D'Hose.

It is custom that the president gets its portrait painted by an artist, in the collection of art of the Senate some famous works can be found like portraits painted by Alfred Cluysenaar.

See also
Belgian Senate
List of presidents of the Belgian Chamber of Representatives
Politics of Belgium

Notes

Sources

External links
Official Website of the Belgian Senate


Presidents of the Senate
Belgium